Listed in alphabetical order by surname, notable former pupils of the former Hamilton Academy school, Scotland, United Kingdom. (Last intake of pupils to Hamilton Academy, 1971.)

A
 Arthur Laidlaw Allan, surveyor with the Directorate of Colonial Surveys, author of the professional text book Practical Field Surveying and Computations, editor (1972–81) of The Survey Review
 Professor John Anderson, writer, activist and Challis Professor of Philosophy at the University of Sydney; brother of Professor William Anderson, another notable alumnus of Hamilton Academy.
 Professor William Anderson, professor of philosophy, Auckland University College, New Zealand, 1921–55; President of the Australian Association of Psychology and Philosophy; brother of Professor John Anderson, another notable alumnus of Hamilton Academy.
 James Craig Annan, pioneering photographer; Honorary Fellow of the Royal Photographic Society
 Dr. Louise Gibson Annand (MacFarquhar) MBE, painter; film-maker; member of the Royal Fine Art Commission for Scotland; President of the Society of Scottish Women Artists; chairperson of the J. D. Fergusson Foundation
 Dr. Walter J D Annand, aeronautical research engineer; academic and author
 Dr. Mary Nicol Neill Armour, artist; Fellow, Royal Scottish Academy; Hon. President, Glasgow School of Art; Hon. President, Royal Glasgow Institute of the Fine Arts; Fellow, the Royal Scottish Society of Painters in Watercolour
 Dr. Ernest Macalpine (Mac) Armstrong CB, LLD; former Chief Medical Officer for Scotland; Fellow, Royal College of Surgeons of Edinburgh; Fellow, Royal College of Physicians and Surgeons of Glasgow; Fellow, Royal College of Physicians of Edinburgh; Fellow, Royal College of General Practitioners; Fellow, the Faculty of Public Health; former Secretary to the British Medical Association
 Frederick Stanley Arnot, missionary, explorer of Central Africa; author; friend of Dr. David Livingstone's family; Fellow, Royal Geographical Society
 Professor Struther Arnott CBE, molecular biologist; Fellow, the Royal Society; Fellow, the Royal Society of Edinburgh; Fellow, King's College London; Fellow, Institute of Biology (becoming the Society of Biology); Fellow, the Royal Society of Chemistry; Principal and Vice-Chancellor, University of St. Andrews; Gold Medallist for General Scholarship and Silver Medallist in Chemistry and in Mathematics, Hamilton Academy, 1952; 1st. science place awardee, Open Bursary Competition 1952, University of Glasgow (from Hamilton Academy)

B
 Dr. Matthew Baillie, physician, pathologist and writer. Fellow 1790, 'Elect' 1809, of the Royal College of Physicians London; Hon Fellow, 1809, of the Royal College of Physicians of Edinburgh and Fellow, the Royal Society
 Alastair Balls CB, senior economic adviser to the Treasury; Departments of Environment and Transport, Undersecretary; Chairman, International Centre for Life; former member of the board of the Independent Television Commission; Chairman, Alzheimer's Society; board member, Higher Education Funding Council for England; Chairman, Northern Rock Foundation
 William Barr OBE, metallurgist; director Colville's; Hon. Treasurer and President, Iron and Steel Institute; Honorary Member, American Iron and Steel Institute
 John Batters, governor, Glasgow School of Art and past chairman of the former Art Lover's House Trust
 Professor Robert Thompson Beaty OBE, engineer, Chair of the Court of the University of Paisley, visiting professor of product design, University of Glasgow, Fellow of the Royal Academy of Engineering, Fellow of the Institution of Electrical Engineers, FIProdE
 Professor Robert J. T. Bell, mathematician and author; Fellow, Royal Society of Edinburgh; Professor of Pure and Applied Mathematics and Dean of the Faculty of Arts and Science, University of Otago, New Zealand
 Dr. Archie Bethel CBE OBE, Chief Executive, Babcock International Group Plc; Fellow, the Royal Society of Edinburgh; Fellow, Royal Academy of Engineering; past vice-President, Institution of Mechanical Engineers; past-President, Scottish Engineering
 John Russell Binning, director, shipping lines; Director, Inland Lines Limited. (Canada); Vice-President, Northern Navigation Company, Limited. (Canada); Treasurer, Montreal Board of Trade and the Shipping Federation of Canada; General Manager (appointed 1903), Furness, Withy & Co. steamship lines.
 Lord Birnam, a judicial title of Sir David King Murray as a Senator of the College of Justice, Scotland
 Major John White Bone, consultant general surgeon. During the Second World War served with the Royal Army Medical Corps in France, evacuated from Dunkirk, returned in the Normandy landings, between times commander of military hospital in Jamaica and seconded to the Johns Hopkins Hospital, Baltimore, U.S.A.
 Craig Brown CBE, footballer, former manager of the Scotland national football team; and manager of Aberdeen F.C.
 Jock Brown, football commentator; former General Manager, Celtic F.C.
 William Brown, architect; Fellow, the Royal Institute of British Architects; partner in the firm of Cullen, Lochhead and Brown, architects of the 'new' Hamilton Academy building, opened in 1913, and other major buildings
 Peter Charles Browne, painter and exponent of William Morris and the Arts and Crafts Movement whose interior (1936) of St. Jude's Church, Ontario, Canada is a Canadian Government-designated (1994) 'National Historic and Architectural Site'
 Sir Andrew Bryan, mining engineer and author; Fellow, the Royal Society of Edinburgh; H.M. Inspector of Mines; The Sir Andrew Bryan Medal awarded by the Institute of Materials, Minerals and Mining
 Professor John Cameron Bryce, first Bradley Professor of English Literature and Emeritus Professor, University of Glasgow; editor, The Glasgow Edition of the Works and Correspondence of Adam Smith; bequeather of The Alexander & Dixon Scholarship (Bryce Bequest) at the University of Glasgow
 Dr. Tom Bryson, consultant anaesthetist; Fellow of the Royal College of Anaesthetists; President, Obstetric Anaesthetists Association; Honorary Surgeon to HM Queen Elizabeth II
 Rev. Dr. George Buchanan OBE, pioneering chaplain to the Scottish communities in South America and member of the Indian Ecclesiastical Establishment from 1934 to 1948
 Robert Burns CB CMG, Deputy Secretary, Ministry of Aviation; Counsellor, British Embassy, Washington; Assistant Secretary, Board of Trade
 William Burt, former Mayor, The Pas, Manitoba, Canada; former President of the Board of Trade (elected 1924)

C
 Sir Alexander Cairncross, economist; Master, St Peter's College, Oxford; Chancellor, University of Glasgow; Fellow, The British Academy; Hon. Fellow, the Royal Society of Edinburgh; first Director of the Economic Development Institute founded by the World Bank; President of the Royal Economic Society
 John Cairncross, former Hamilton Academy Dux medallist, linguist, author, one of the KGB's Cambridge Five ('Ring of Five'), brother of Sir Alexander Cairncross
 Robert Russell Calder, author, editor and critic; formerly editor with Chapman Publishing, Scotland
 Professor Archibald Y. Campbell, classical scholar, published poet and author of emendations of classical texts; (graduate and) Fellow, St John's College, Cambridge; Gladstone Professor of Greek, University of Liverpool
 Sir George Campbell MP, banker; director, P & O Steamship Company; Lieutenant-Governor of Bengal, India
 Sir Matthew Campbell KBE CB, Secretary, Department of Agriculture and Fisheries, Scotland
 Madge Carruthers, President of the Scottish Women's Amateur Athletic Association; manager Scottish women's athletic team, Commonwealth Games, Christchurch, New Zealand, 1974
 James Cassels JP, Hon. Sheriff-Substitute, son of Provost Andrew Cassels of Hamilton
 Thomas Cassells MP; Sheriff-substitute of Inverness, Elgin and Nairn; Dean of Guild for the Burgh of Falkirk; McFarlane Scholar in Law, University of Glasgow
 Bob Cleland, Chief Executive of the multi-national, the Howden Group
 Sir Ken Collins former MEP; Fellow, the Royal Scottish Geographical Society; Honorary Fellow of the Chartered Institution of Water and Environmental Management, and the Chartered Institution of Wastes Management; past-Chairman of the committee on the Environment, Public Health and Consumer Protection at the European Parliament; past-Chairman of the Scottish Environment Protection Agency (SEPA)
 David Colville Jr., steel magnate, David Colville & Sons, Dalzell works, Motherwell. Largest steel producing plant in Scotland and record output for Great Britain (1901). Uncle of John Colville, 1st Baron Clydesmuir, Viceroy and Governor-General of India
 Squadron Leader Denis Richard Colvin, Inspector of Lighting, Glasgow; President and Honorary Fellow of the Institution of Lighting Engineers
 Robert Craig Connal QC, appointed Scotland's first Solicitor Advocate QC (2002); former Council Member, Royal Faculty of Procurators in Glasgow; Convenor, the Law Society of Scotland Supreme Courts Training Course (Civil)
 Sheriff Principal Graham Cox QC, former Sheriff of Tayside, Central and Fife and Sheriff principal of South Strathclyde, Dumfries and Galloway, in whose Scottish court at Kamp Van Zeist, The Netherlands, the suspects arrested regarding the Lockerbie air disaster first appeared on 6 April 1999
 Thomas Rae Craig CBE, director, British Steel Corporation; former President of the Iron and Steel Institute and chairman of the Hunterston Development Company
 John McKinnon Crawford DA, painter
 John M. Crawford, Fellow of the Royal Institute of British Architects; the first architect to be elected President of Glasgow Art Club (1903)
 Robert N. Cross, Principal, Manchester College, University of Oxford (Harris Manchester College, Oxford)
 Colonel Alexander Cullen OBE, Commander 6th. Battalion of the Cameronian Regiment; Fellow, the Surveyors' Institution; Fellow, the Society of Antiquaries of Scotland; President (1951–53), the Royal Incorporation of Architects in Scotland; Fellow, Royal Institute of British Architects; governor of the Royal College of Art and of Glasgow School of Art. Son of Alexander Cullen Snr., of Cullen, Lochhead and Brown, architects, the 'new' Hamilton Academy building (completed 1913.)
 Professor William Cullen, chemist, Professor of Chemistry and Medicine, University of Edinburgh; Fellow, the Royal Society; a founding member of the Royal Society of Edinburgh and the Royal Medical Society; President of the Glasgow Faculty of Physicians and Surgeons (becoming in 1962, the Royal College of Physicians and Surgeons of Glasgow)
 John E. Cunningham, first Principal, Bathgate Technical College; former Head of Engineering, David Dale Technical College, Glasgow

D
 Professor Ian Deary, psychologist and author; Director, Medical Research Council (UK) Centre for Cognitive Ageing and Cognitive Epidemiology, University of Edinburgh; Fellow, Royal College of Physicians of Edinburgh; Fellow, Royal Society of Edinburgh; Fellow, British Academy; Fellow, Academy of Medical Sciences; Fellow, Royal College of Psychiatrists; Associate Fellow, British Psychological Society; Founder-Member of the International Society for Intelligence Research
 Dr. James Stedman Dixon J.P., President of the Mining Institute of Scotland and President of the Institution of Mining Engineers of Great Britain; member of the Royal Commission on Coal Supplies; founder (1907) of the Chair in Mining Engineering (now the James S. Dixon Chair of Applied Geology) University of Glasgow; endowed the Dr. James S. Dixon Bursary in Mining Engineering for pupils of technical subjects at Hamilton Academy
 Squadron Leader Dr. William John Atkinson Dobson, Medical Officer to the National Coal Board
 Dougie Donnelly, television and radio presenter
 Colin Douglas, novelist. Pseudonym of Dr. Colin Currie, lecturer and consultant in geriatric medicine. Trustee of the Institute of Medical Ethics
 Laura Duncan, Sheriff of Glasgow and Strathkelvin, Scotland
 Captain James Churchill Dunn, doctor and author of the book, The War the Infantry Knew, 1914–1919

F
 W Kenneth Fee, former sub-Editor, Glasgow Herald; (past Editor) and Director, The Scots Independent; former President of the National Union of Students Scotland
 Professor Ian Ford, professor and Director, Robertson Centre for Biostatistics and former Dean, Faculty of Information and Mathematical Sciences, University of Glasgow; Fellow, Royal Society of Edinburgh; Fellow, Royal College of Physicians and Surgeons of Glasgow; Member of the American Statistical Association and the Royal Statistical Society
 Professor Dr. John Samuel Forrest, physicist, electrical engineer; professor emeritus University of Strathclyde, Fellow, the Royal Society, Fellow, Royal Meteorological Society, Fellow, Institution of Engineering and Technology, a Dux, Mathematics and Science medalist, Hamilton Academy (1925)
 Robert Forrest, architect and contractor; builder of important buildings in New Zealand, including Dunedin University (University of Otago)
 Sir Charles Annand Fraser DL, former Chairman, Lothian & Edinburgh Enterprise and of Adam and Company PLC; former director, British Assets Trust PLC, Scottish Television PLC, Scottish Business in the Community, Stakis PLC; former Council Member, Law Society of Scotland, and Trustee World Wildlife Fund (UK)
 Andrew Froude ISO, Registrar General for Scotland (appointed 1930)
 Dr. William Wright Fulton OBE, physician; Fellow, Royal College of General Practitioners; former Chair, Area Medical Committee, Glasgow

G
 Professor Sir John Currie Gunn CBE FRSE, physicist and natural philosopher. Pioneer in nuclear and particle physics and quantum mechanics. A very much loved professor and colleague, Gunn was also awarded four honorary D.Sc.'s. Retired in 1982 and died in 2002.
 Professor Dr. Malcolm Gavin CBE MBE, physicist, engineer and pioneer of radar; Professor of Electronic Engineering Science, University College of North Wales; Principal of Chelsea College (see King's College, London)
 Lord Robert Gibson MP, Senator of the College of Justice, Scotland, and as Chairman of the Scottish Land Court succeeding another Hamilton Academy former pupil, Lord Murray
 Professor Douglas Alston Gilchrist, agriculturalist and academic; Fellow, the Royal Society of Edinburgh (1900)
 Dr. Marion Gilchrist, the first woman to graduate from the University of Glasgow and the first woman to qualify in medicine from a Scottish university (1894 University of Glasgow); one of the founders (1902) of the Glasgow and West of Scotland Association for Women's Suffrage; and President of the Glasgow and West Scotland Association of the Medical Women's Federation
 Robert Glen, prison Governor
 Alex Graham, independent television programme producer whose company has won Oscar (Academy Award), Emmy, BAFTA and Peabody Awards; Fellow of the Royal Television Society; Fellow Royal Society of Arts; visiting Fellow, University of Bournemouth Media School

H
 Brigadier Thomas Haddon CBE OBE, Chief of Staff, Hong Kong Land Forces; raised the Singapore Armed Forces; aide-de-camp to H.M. Queen Elizabeth II; Assistant Secretary of the Joint Intelligence Sub-Committee of the War Cabinet; Commanding Officer, 1st battalion, Border Regiment
 Alexander Hamilton CBE, JP; former Vice-Chairman, Royal Bank of Scotland and past-President, the Law Society of Scotland
 Alexander H. Harley, Principal, Madrasah College, Calcutta, India (now Aliah University)
 John C. E. Hay; Sheriff of Glasgow
 Dr. David Willis Wilson Henderson CB, microbiologist; Fellow, the Royal Society; President of the Society for General Microbiology; awarded the U.S. Presidential Medal of Freedom, 1946
 Henry Herron CBE, Procurator-Fiscal for Glasgow
 Major General J. R. Holden CBE DSO, Chief of the British Military Mission to the Soviet Zone of Germany; General Officer Commanding 43rd (Wessex) Infantry Division; Director, Royal Armoured Corps
 Detective Chief Superintendent Ian Hosie, Joint head of Strathclyde Police CID; Director of the Scottish Criminal Record Office (SCRO)
 John Whiteford Hutson OBE, diplomat; former Counsellor, Head of the Communications Operations Department, Foreign and Commonwealth Office and Consul General

I
 Sir John Inch CBE, CVO, Chief Constable Dunfermline City Police (1943–49), Fife Police (1949–55) and Edinburgh City Police (1955–76)
 Colonel Thomas Alexander Irvine D.S.O., T.D., D.L., Commanding Officer, 7th Battalion Worcestershire Regiment; Deputy Lieutenant of Lanark to H.M. King George VI (appointed December 1950)
 Professor Dr. John Irving, Chair of Theoretical Physics, University of Cape Town
 Dr. David Irwin DPM, clinical psychiatrist; a Founder Fellow of the Royal College of Psychiatrists

J
 Professor Robert Jack, mathematician, physicist and pioneer of radio broadcasting, New Zealand; Dean of the Faculty of Arts and Science, University of Otago, New Zealand
 Rev Gordon David Jamieson, Parish Minister then Head of Stewardship, Church of Scotland
 Robin Jenkins OBE, novelist; awarded the Saltire Society Lifetime Achievement Award 2003; portrait, by Jennifer McRae, in the collection of the National Portrait Gallery of Scotland
 Professor William Johnstone, former Dean of the Faculty of Divinity, and Emeritus Professor of Hebrew and Semitic Languages, University of Aberdeen; President, Society for Old Testament Study

K
 Lord Keith of Avonholm, Privy Counsellor; Senator of the College of Justice, Scotland; King's Counsel
D.C. Thomson & Co. publishers – archives; Scottish and Universal newspapers – archives; Scottish Office archived material, Channel 4 U.K. discussion programme interviewee
 Dr. Duncan Livingston Kerr DL, OBE, TD, physician; honorary colonel of the 51st (Highland) Infantry Division RAMC.; Deputy Lieutenant of the County of Lanark to HM King George VI and HM Queen Elizabeth II
 Dr. W. H. Kerr, one of the Founders, and Fellow of the Royal College of General Practitioners
 Dr. John Knox, consultant physician; clinical senior lecturer in medicine, University of Aberdeen; Fellow, Royal College of Physicians, London; Fellow, Royal College of Physicians and Surgeons of Glasgow; Fellow, Royal College of Physicians of Edinburgh

L
 Sir Robert Hamilton Lang, financier; director of the Imperial Ottoman Bank; H.M. Brittanic Consul in Cyprus; collector of antiquities, parts of his collection in the British Museum, the Louvre and donated to Glasgow Art Gallery and Museum at Kelvingrove. Uncle of Cosmo Gordon Lang, Archbishop of Canterbury, 1928–1942.
 Sir Andrew Gibson Latta, shipping line owner, director of Lawther, Latta  & Co. Ltd., London; knighted (1921) for services to Ministry of Shipping, war effort, World War I. Brother of Sir John Latta, Bt.
 Thomas Laurie OBE, former board member and Chairman, Traverse Theatre; past Chairman, and Trustee WASPS Trust (Workshop and Artists' Studio Provision Scotland); Trustee, Scottish Civic Trust; former member of the Drama Panel, Scottish Arts Council; Fellow of the Royal Institution of Chartered Surveyors
 John Leggate CBE, former Chief Information Officer, BP; Fellow of the Institution of Electrical Engineers; Fellow of the Royal Academy of Engineering
 David Leslie, international rugby union referee
 David Alexander Liddell OBE, chemist; expert on explosives and propellents; Managing Chemist, Royal Ordnance Factory
 Gilbert Little CBE, Fellow, Institution of Civil Engineers; President of the Institution of Water Engineers
 Ian Lang Livingstone CBE OBE DL, former Chairman, Motherwell College; former Chairman Motherwell Football Club and Governor, David Livingstone Memorial Trust
 Lieutenant-Colonel Dr. Donald Kenneth Lennox, consultant surgeon; senior medical army officer in Hiroshima after bombing
 John Duncan Lowe CB, Sheriff of Glasgow and Strathkelvin; Crown Agent for Scotland

M
 Douglas McBain, Olympic footballer (Olympic Games, London 1948) and lecturer, Telford College, Edinburgh
 Elsie McBroom (née MacPhail), as of 2010, possibly the oldest surviving former pupil of Hamilton Academy; a graduate of the University of Glasgow and a former teacher of mathematics, Ayr, Scotland. Aged 100, news posted by South Ayrshire Council
 Carlyle McBride McCance, former chief veterinary officer for the City of Glasgow (and former Hamilton Academy Dux)
 William McCance, artist and former controller of the celebrated Gregynog Press, Wales
 Margery Palmer McCulloch, literary scholar and author; Senior Honorary Research Fellow in Scottish Literature, University of Glasgow; former Honorary Secretary of the Saltire Society
 Margo McDonald MSP, politician
 Ian McDougall, Hamilton-born American soccer player elected into soccer Hall of Fame, U.S.A.; former director, chief financial officer and vice chairman of the board of the multi-national, Inco Ltd. (now Vale Limited)
 Professor Sir Alistair MacFarlane CBE, electrical engineer and academic; former Principal and Vice Chancellor, Heriot-Watt University and Rector, University of the Highlands and Islands Millennium Institute; Fellow and former vice-president, the Royal Society; Fellow, the Royal Society of Edinburgh; Fellow, the Royal Academy of Engineering; Fellow, former Vice-Master and Honorary Fellow, Selwyn College, Cambridge
 Major General John McGhie CB, President of the Ministry of Defence Army Medical Board; Director of Army Psychiatry; Honorary Physician to HM Queen Elizabeth II (appointed 1971); Fellow of the Royal College of Psychiatrists
 Professor Edward McCombie McGirr CBE, Muirhead professor of medicine at Glasgow Royal Infirmary; Dean of the Faculty of Medicine and Dean of Faculties, University of Glasgow; President of the Royal College of Physicians and Surgeons of Glasgow; Fellow, the Royal Society of Edinburgh; Fellow, the American College of Physicians; honorary consultant physician to the army in Scotland
 William McIlwraith, Sheriff-substitute of Lothian and Peebles
 Dr. Robert McIntyre MP; former leader of the Scottish National Party; and Provost of Stirling
 Hugh McPherson, former managing director of A.G. Barr, producers of Scotland's iconic soft drink, Irn-Bru and of McVitie's part of the multi-national United Biscuits
 Alastair McWhirter QPM, former Chief Constable of Suffolk Constabulary; Chairman, Suffolk Primary Care Trust
 Professor Thomas J Mackie CBE, MD, LLD, bacteriologist, author; Dean of the Faculty of Medicine, University of Edinburgh; Wernher-Beit Chair of Bacteriology, University of Cape Town, S.A.; Member, the Royal College of Physicians of Edinburgh; Fellow, the Royal Society of Edinburgh; Corresponding Member of the Royal Academy of Medicine of Rome
 Dr. Robert Macnish; surgeon physician and author; his portrait by Daniel Maclise in the National Gallery, London
 Professor John Millar; philosopher, historian, author and Regius Professor of Civil Law at the University of Glasgow from 1761 to 1800. The John Millar Chair of Law at the University of Glasgow was established in his memory in 1985.
 Ian Mitchell, former Lord Mayor of Exeter
 David Morrison, author, poet and painter; founder and former editor of the 'Scotia Review'
 Dr. Robert Franklin Muirhead, mathematician, writer and President of the Edinburgh Mathematical Society
 Sir David King Murray MP, (judicial titles Lord Murray and Lord Birnam), politician; judge; Solicitor General for Scotland; Senator of the College of Justice; and Chairman of the Scottish Land Court
 Lord Murray, a judicial title of Sir David King Murray, as Chairman of the Scottish Land Court preceding Lord Robert Gibson, another Hamilton Academy former pupil
 William MacFarlane

N
 Rev. Robert Nicol, Principal, Manchester College, Oxford

P
 Robert Hamilton Paterson, architect and surveyor to the Police Commissioners of the County of Lanark
 Lieutenant-Colonel Dr David Paton; medical officer with 2 Commando on the daring St Nazaire raid (sometimes referred to as 'The Greatest Raid of All') in 1942, involving HMS Campbeltown (USS Buchanan (DD-131)), the 1952 film 'The Gift Horse' starring Trevor Howard being loosely based on this raid
 Lieutenant Colonel William Patrick, General Manager, the Caledonian Railway Company
 Walter Perrie, author and Writer in Residence at the University of Stirling and University of British Columbia
 Professor William Henderson Pringle, lecturer in economics at Birkbeck College, University of London; Chair of Economics at the University of New Zealand and lecturer in economics at the London School of Economics

R
 Henry Cunison Rankin, chartered accountant; lecturer and director of student education Institute of Chartered Accountants of Scotland; national Chairman of the Saltire Society; former national Treasurer, Scottish National Party
 James Gordon Reid, actor; member of the Royal Shakespeare Company
 Rev. Dr. David Syme Russell CBE, General Secretary of the Baptist Union of Great Britain; author
 Lieutenant Colonel Dr. John Russell Grant Rice, 51st Highland Division RAMC; one of the first British officers to enter the Belsen concentration camp on its relief, 15 April 1945; deputy-Chairman, Bury and Rochdale Health Authority; magistrate

S
 Thomas Alexander Scholes OBE; Chief Executive Renfrewshire Council
 Professor James Shepherd; internationally recognised pioneer in the study of the causes, prevention and treatment of coronary heart disease; Head of the Department of Vascular Biochemistry; Honorary Professor, Cardiovascular and Medical Sciences, University of Glasgow; Fellow, Royal Society of Edinburgh; Fellow, Academy of Medical Sciences; Fellow, Royal College of Physicians and Surgeons of Glasgow; Fellow, Royal College of Pathologists
 Thomas Sommerville, educationalist; former Rector, The High School of Montreal; Director of Education, Montreal, Canada
 Lord Stallard MP, Chief Whip and a Lord Commissioner of the Treasury in the Callaghan government
 Air Vice-Marshal William Kilpatrick Stewart CB CBE AFC, commander RAF Institute of Aviation Medicine; the Stewart Lecture at the Royal Aeronautical Society established in his honour in 1969

T
 Lieutenant-Colonel Joseph Ramsay Tainsh CBE, Director, Iraq State Railways
 Dr. Alexander Burt Taylor CBE, former Registrar General for Scotland; Fellow, the Royal Society of Edinburgh
 Dr. Peter Dewar Thomson OBE, founder member and Provost of the Northern Faculty of the Royal College of General Practitioners; Fellow, Royal College of General Practitioners; Fellow, Royal College of Surgeons of Edinburgh
 Professor Samuel Thomson, chemist, author; Fellow, Royal Institute of Chemistry (becoming in 1980, the Royal Society of Chemistry); Director of Chemical Laboratories, University of Glasgow
 David Thorburn, Chief Operating Officer and Executive Director, Clydesdale Bank plc and the Yorkshire Bank; former Chairman, CBI (Confederation of British Industry) Scotland; past President of the Chartered Institute of Bankers in Scotland
 Dr. Sam Thorburn CBE, Fellow, Royal Academy of Engineering; Former President of the Institution of Structural Engineers; Fellow, Institution of Civil Engineers; Chairman, Building Standards Advisory Committee

W
 George Waddell, Registrar, High Court of Kenya
 Rev. Dr. James Bernard Walker, Chaplain, St. Andrews University; former Principal, The Queen's College, Birmingham; Awardee of the University of St Andrews University Medal, 2011
 Sir Edward Hamilton Wallace, judge, Supreme Court of Judicature at Madras, India; Snell Exhibitioner from the University of Glasgow to Balliol College, Oxford, 1893; knighted 1931
 Dr. David Warnock OBE, veterinary surgeon, politician; Deputy Minister for Agriculture, Government of British Columbia, Canada (1919–1932)
 Professor Doctor Alan Watson CorrFRSE (William Alexander Jardine Watson), internationally renowned academic and author in the field of Roman law, Comparative law, legal history, and law and religion; former Lecturer at Wadham College, Oxford (1957–1959) and at Oriel College, Oxford (1959–1960) and Fellow, Oriel College, from 1960 to 1965. Appointed to the Douglas Chair of Civil Law at University of Glasgow in 1965 and appointed Professor of Civil Law at the University of Edinburgh (1968–1981). Appointed Professor of Law and Classical Studies at the University of Pennsylvania Law School in 1979, and subsequently appointed at that university Director of the Center for Advanced Studies in Legal History (1980), Nicholas F Gallichio Professor of Law (1984), and University Professor of Law in 1986. Appointed Ernest P Rogers Professor of Law at the University of Georgia in 1989. In 1997, he was elected Visiting Honorary Professor of Private Law at the University of Edinburgh. Elected a Corresponding Fellow, Royal Society of Edinburgh' in 2004. Watson has been awarded Honorary Doctorates by the universities of University of Stockholm, Glasgow, Edinburgh, University of Pretoria, University of Palermo and University of Belgrade, in addition to eight traditional degrees from the universities of Oxford, Glasgow and Edinburgh. 
 Tom Watson, stage, television and film actor
 William Frame White RAMC, Consultant Orthopaedic Surgeon; Fellow, Royal College of Physicians and Surgeons of Glasgow; Fellow, Royal College of Surgeons of Edinburgh; Fellow, the British Orthopaedic Association; Council member, British Society for Surgery of the Hand
 Agnes Wilkie, film and television programmes producer, former Head of Features Scottish Television (STV), Director of Creative Industry, Northern Film and Industry, Head of International Development, TRC Media. BAFTA Scotland and BAFTA award winning television programmes and films
 Ross Wilson, Director, Scottish Enterprise Renfrewshire; Honorary Fellow, University of Glasgow; Managing Director, James Howden & Co. Ltd., marine engineers; Member, the Institute of Physics
 Captain William Scott Branks Wilson, solicitor and soldier, The Great War. His letters published posthumously, 1919, in a book called 'On Active Service', and one included in 'War Letters of Fallen Englishmen' (London 1930, Laurence Housman, editor.) (Captain Wilson, eldest son of former Provost Wilson of Motherwell, was an Hamilton Academy Dux medallist.)
 Sir Robert Wright DSO OBE, surgeon; President of the General Medical Council; Fellow, Royal College of Physicians; President, Royal College of Physicians and Surgeons of Glasgow; Fellow, Royal College of Surgeons of Edinburgh; Honorary Fellow, Royal Australasian College of Surgeons; Honorary Fellow, Royal College of Surgeons of England

References

Hamilton Academy